

List of  natural gas processing plants in Nigeria 

Capacity data at standard conditions. ( is million cubic feet per day.  is million cubic metres per day.)

Natural gas in Nigeria